The Old Daber Airfield (also known as Wittstock Air Base), is an abandoned military air base located just outside the town of Wittstock in the Ostprignitz-Ruppin district, in north-western Brandenburg, Germany.

History
From 1934, under Nazi-air skills initiative to revive the Luftwaffe, the site served as a glider field. From 1938 it was developed formally as a Luftwaffe airfield, with building extensions stopping in 1940. By this time the southern section of the site was linked to the railway at Groß Haßlow.

On 3 May 1945, the Red Army overran the airfield, and occupied the site. From this point forward, several units of the Soviet Air Force were stationed at the site. From 1961, the attached air regiments included the 33 IAP (Jagdfliegerregiment/Fighter Regiment), equipped with MiG-29 Fulcrum-A/B fighter and the MiG-23UM Flogger-C operational trainer. The regiment was part of the 16th GwIAD (Gardejagdfliegerdivision/Guards Fighter Division) within the 16th Luftarmee with headquarters in Damgarten.

With the reunification of West Germany and East Germany from 1989/1990, the Soviet Army agreed to return all bases by the end of 1994. The airfield was handed back to the district authorities on 20 June 1994. The airfield was then used for a time by the Bundeswehr, before being abandoned.

Present
After abandonment, the airfield served as a race track, during which the fauna and flora of the heathland began to take over the facilities.

It was also used to host a series of electronic music festivals, including FULLmoOON festival.

Local plans for the  site propose the development of a photovoltaic cell storage plant, with a power of 50MW.

References

External links
 Military Airfield Directory. Cold War Airfields. Wittstock Airbase

World War II airfields in Germany
Military facilities of the Soviet Union in Germany
Airports in Brandenburg
Defunct airports in Germany